Mieczysław Stefan Chmura (1 January 1934 – 9 April 1980), was a Polish ice hockey player. He played for Podhale Nowy Targ during his career. He also played for the Polish national team at the 1956 Winter Olympics, and  the 1959 World Championship. After his playing career he turned to coaching.

References

External links
 

1934 births
1980 deaths
Ice hockey players at the 1956 Winter Olympics
Olympic ice hockey players of Poland
People from Nowy Targ
Podhale Nowy Targ players
Poland men's national ice hockey team coaches
Polish ice hockey defencemen
Sportspeople from Lesser Poland Voivodeship